Tah Rud (also Romanized as Tah Rūd) is a village in Nazil Rural District, Nukabad District, Khash County, Sistan and Baluchestan Province, Iran. At the 2006 census, its population was 50, in 10 families.

References 

Populated places in Khash County